Ran Online (stylized as RAN Online) was a massively multiplayer online role-playing game developed by Min Communications, Inc..

After starting the first official service in Korea in July 2004, RAN Online continued to expand globally. Servers were opened in Taiwan and Hong Kong in May 2005, Japan in September 2005, Malaysia in October 2005, Thailand in November 2005, the Philippines in January 2006, and North America in November 2013. On August 12, 2019, its official Facebook page announced the game's closure. Meanwhile, in 2018, Wavegame published RAN with the name "New RAN Online" in Southeast Asian region. However, it shut down on June 30, 2021.

Schools 
You could choose schools for your characters. There were three main schools in the game: Sacred Gate, Mystic Peak and Phoenix. 

School members can also participate in School Wars (formerly called Tyranny) every three hours. The goal of the game is to capture the three towers positioned in different locations in the modified map of Saint Power Plant. A school immediately won if it captured all towers or if it captured two after 30 minutes; otherwise, there is no winner.

Classes 
The game's classes originally consists of male Brawler (alternatively called Fighter), male Swordsman (alt. Knight), female Archer, and female Shaman (alt. QiGong). Rebirth update turns classes no longer gender specific and introduced the Extreme class, which can be only unlocked on accounts with an existing character in specific level. Later updates added Gunner (alt. Scientist), Assassin, Magician and Shaper classes.

Item Shop and Payment
Players can buy many different costumes such as wedding dresses or movie themed outfits, different kinds of pets (Siberian Husky, Turtle, White Tiger, Ranny Bear) and the recently added pets (Monkey, Panther, Pixie, Saurus), their pet skills (Automatic potion, Auto Looting, Auto recovery, Attack and Defense increase, Item non-drop), nail arts, hairstyles, accessories, destiny boxes, bikes that can increase the movement speed of the player, game points and other items through the Ran Item Shop.

Players can also change different stats of their armors and weapons using different reform cards (Reform Card, Basic Stat Reform Card, Additional Stat Reform Card). Moreover, seal cards (Seal Card, Dual Seal Card, Triple Seal Card) can also be used to retain certain stat points while reforming.

References

2004 video games
Products and services discontinued in 2019
Massively multiplayer online role-playing games
Video games developed in South Korea
Windows games
Windows-only games
Inactive massively multiplayer online games
Free online games
Free-to-play video games